The Lijadu Sisters (born 22 October 1948), Taiwo and Kehinde Lijadu (died 9 November 2019), were identical twin sisters from Nigeria who were a Nigerian music duo from the mid-1960s to the 1980s. They achieved success in Nigeria and had modest influence in the United States and Europe. They were notable for being a West African version of the Pointer Sisters who mixed Afrobeat sounds with jazz and disco, according to one source. Since the late 1980s, they retired from the music scene. They were cousins of popular Nigerian musician Fela Kuti.

Career
The twins grew up in the Nigerian city of Ibadan, and were inspired musically by various artists including Aretha Franklin, Victor Olaiya and Miriam Makeba. They had guidance from music producer Lemmy Jackson who is credited with helping them with their early successes. Their music was a mix of Jazz, Afrobeat, Reggae and Waka. Sometimes they sang in English and other times in African languages. One of their first songs was arranged with assistance from jazz saxophone player Orlando Julius. They released their first album Iya Mi Jowo in 1969 after winning a record contract with Decca Records.
They worked with the late Biddy Wright on their third album Danger (1976). They recorded Sunshine in 1978 and Horizon Unlimited in 1979.

The sisters were top stars in Nigeria during the 1970s and 1980s. During these years, they branched out to America and Europe and found modest success. They performed with drummer Ginger Baker's band Salt at the 1972 Munich Olympic Games in Munich at the World Music Festival. The New York Times reported that the sisters were  "smiling free spirits" who mixed "sisterly banter and flirtatiousness" in their performances which featured positive messages such as the benefit of returning home. Their reggae number Reincarnation insisted that if reincarnation was a reality, then they would like to be reincarnated again into the home where they grew up. Some of their song lyrics were politically themed. Their harmonies were described as "ethereal".

In 1984 Shanachie Records released Double Trouble in the US which was a compilation of their previously recorded material from their albums Horizon Unlimited and Danger. Their song "Orere Elejigbo" was included on a double CD entitled Nigeria 70, Africa 100, and was added to the Roots & Wings playlist in 1997.

The sisters moved to Brooklyn. They performed in various venues including the lower Manhattan club Wetlands and in Harlem with King Sunny Adé's African Beats as their backing band. They performed with the Philadelphia-based band Philly Gumbo. They were featured in the music documentary Konkombé by English director Jeremy Marre, and their music was featured in the Nigerian instalment of the 14-episode world music series entitled Beats of the Heart which aired on PBS during the late 1980s.

On 1 April 2014, they appeared live at an all-star tribute, the Atomic! Bomb Band, for reclusive Nigerian musician William Onyeabor at the Barbican Centre in London. They sang some of their own tracks including "Danger", as well as providing backing and lead vocals on William Onyeabor material. They also performed with the Atomic! Bomb Band on The Tonight Show Starring Jimmy Fallon and on tour dates in New York, San Francisco and Los Angeles in May 2014.

On 9 November 2019, Kehinde suffered a stroke and died on the same day, at the age of 71.

Reviews
 The New York Times music critic Jon Pareles described their music as "a West African parallel to the Pointer Sisters" with a mix of Nigerian Afro-beat, reggae, South African pop with elements of disco and "Memphis soul". Critic Peter Watrous described the sisters sound as "riveting".

 Reviewer Myles Boisen in All Music Guide wrote that they were "a rarity in the African music scene" and added that they were "liberated twin sisters who share the spotlight on smooth close harmonies and command a sharp, inventive backing band."

Discography

References

External links
 – official site

1948 births
2019 deaths
Living people
Nigerian reggae musical groups
Nigerian musical duos
Yoruba women musicians
Nigerian twins
Musicians from Ibadan
Twin musical duos
20th-century Nigerian women singers
21st-century Nigerian women singers
English-language singers from Nigeria
Yoruba-language singers
Musical groups established in 1965
Musical groups disestablished in 1990
Musical groups reestablished in 2014
Musical groups disestablished in 2019
Atomic Bomb! Band members
Female musical duos
Identical twin females
1965 establishments in Nigeria
2019 disestablishments in Nigeria